General Wrottesley may refer to:

George Wrottesley (1827–1909), British Army major general
John Wrottesley, 1st Baron Wrottesley (1771–1841), British Army major general
Sir John Wrottesley, 8th Baronet (1744–1787), British Army major general